Rhinobothriidae is a family of flatworms belonging to the order Rhinebothriidea.

Genera:
 Rhinebothrium 
 Rhinebothroides
 Rhodobothrium
 Scalithrium

References

Platyhelminthes